Haroldo Lima (15 January 1939 in Caetité – 24 March 2021 in Salvador, Bahia) was a Brazilian politician and anti-dictatorship activist.

Biography
He served as a Deputy from 1983 to 2003 and as Director General of the National Agency of Petroleum, Natural Gas and Biofuels from 2005 to 2011.

References

1939 births
2021 deaths
Members of the Chamber of Deputies (Brazil) from Bahia
Deaths from the COVID-19 pandemic in Bahia